Hanna Nasser (1937 – July 5, 2015) was the mayor of Bethlehem from 1997 to 2005, being succeeded by Victor Batarseh. Nasser is a Palestinian Christian.

See also
Palestinian Christians

External links
Sombre Christmas in Bethlehem BBC News

Mayors of Bethlehem
Palestinian Christians
Living people
1937 births
2015 deaths
People from Bethlehem